Alain Geiger (born 5 November 1960) is a Swiss international football manager and a former defender. He is the current manager for Servette FC.

He played mainly as a centre-back despite being only 1.80m in a career that lasted 20 years, and made 112 appearances at international level, being Switzerland's second most capped player behind Heinz Hermann. His son, Bastien, is also a professional footballer.

Playing career

Club
Geiger started playing professionally in 1977 with FC Sion. He played just two matches in his first season but by 1978, he was a first-team regular in the side that went on to win the Swiss Cup in 1980.

In 1981, he signed for Servette FC, who were one of Switzerland's most successful teams at the time, and became an invaluable player for both club and country. He helped the club win the 1984 Swiss Cup, defeating Lausanne Sports 1–0 after extra time in the final, and the league title in 1985. An aspiring Neuchâtel Xamax side acquired his services in 1986, and he helped it win the national championship during the only two seasons he played for them, 1986–87 and 1987–88.

A move to France was on the cards next for Geiger, as he signed for AS Saint-Étienne during the Summer of 1988. He was a big hit and a first-team regular at Stade Geoffroy-Guichard, but opted for a return to Switzerland and Sion, in 1990. During his second spell, he saw the form of his life as he became captain for both club and the country. He lifted the league trophy for the fourth time in his career as Sion were crowned champions in 1991–92.

In 1995, Geiger signed for Grasshopper Club Zürich, where he finishing his career after a further two seasons, having played 496 Swiss first division matches, with 38 goals.

International
Geiger made his international debut in Switzerland's 2–1 defeat to England at Wembley Stadium, on 19 November 1980, and went on to be capped 112 times and score five goals, between 1980 and 1996, five appearances short of midfielder Heinz Hermann.

His last match was also against England, in a 1–1 draw at Euro 1996, on 8 June. He captained his country at both this competition and the 1994 FIFA World Cup in the United States, usually being accompanied at centre-back by Dominique Herr.

Coaching career
Geiger's first managerial role was spent with the reserves of Grasshopper, in 1997. He did so well there that he was given the reigns at another old side, Neuchâtel Xamax, in July 1998. At Xamax, he helped develop the talents of Timothée Atouba, Papa Bouba Diop and Henri Camara, and helped the club avoid relegation from the league in his last two seasons.

Geiger quit the club in July 2002 to take over at FC Aarau, but the club were relegated into the second division at the end of 2002–03 and he was given the sack. In December 2003, he was surprisingly named the manager of Grasshopper, but the team fared poorly under him and he was once again fired.

Subsequently, Geiger had short spells managing Neuchâtel Xamax, FC Aarau and Lausanne Sports before being given the job at Moroccan side Olympique Safi in 2006. He saved the club from relegation from GNF 1 during the 2006–07 season, but resigned at the end of the campaign.

In June 2009, he was replaced by Pierre-André Schürmann as head coach of Neuchâtel Xamax.

In January 2010, he was appointed as manager of Algerian club JS Kabylie. On 14 December 2010, Geiger resigned from his position. During his time with the club, his most notable achievement was leading the team to the semi-finals of the 2010 CAF Champions League where they lost to eventual champions TP Mazembe.

On 23 September 2011, Geiger was appointed as manager of ES Sétif. In his first season with the club, he led the team to the league-cup double, winning the 2011–12 Algerian Ligue Professionnelle 1 and the 2011–12 Algerian Cup.

On 6 June 2012, Geiger became manager of Saudi club Ettifaq FC, signing a two-year contract with the club.

On 30 May 2013, Geiger reached an agreement with MC Alger to take over as new coach, succeeding Djamel Menad.

Taking over Geneva's Servette FC in 2018, the team wins the Swiss Challenge League at the end of his first season, getting promoted to the Super League.

Honours

Player
Sion
 Nationalliga A: 1991–92
 Swiss Cup: 1979–80, 1990–91, 1994–95

Servette
 Nationalliga A: 1984–85
 Swiss Cup: 1983–84

Neuchâtel Xamax
 Nationalliga A: 1986–87, 1987–88
 Swiss Super Cup: 1987

Manager
Grasshoppers
 Swiss Cup: runner-up 2003–04

ES Sétif
 Algerian Cup: 2011–12
 Algerian Ligue Professionnelle 1: 2011–12

Servette
 Swiss Challenge League: 2018–19

See also
 List of men's footballers with 100 or more international caps

References

External links
 

1960 births
Living people
Swiss men's footballers
Swiss Super League players
FC Sion players
Servette FC players
Neuchâtel Xamax FCS players
Grasshopper Club Zürich players
Ligue 1 players
AS Saint-Étienne players
Switzerland international footballers
1994 FIFA World Cup players
UEFA Euro 1996 players
Swiss football managers
Swiss expatriate footballers
Expatriate footballers in France
FIFA Century Club
Association football defenders
Swiss-French people
Neuchâtel Xamax FCS managers
FC Aarau managers
Grasshopper Club Zürich managers
FC Lausanne-Sport managers
Expatriate football managers in Algeria
Expatriate football managers in Egypt
JS Kabylie managers
ES Sétif managers
Expatriate football managers in Saudi Arabia
Ettifaq FC managers
MC Alger managers
People from Sion District
Olympic Club de Safi managers
Swiss Challenge League managers
Swiss Super League managers
Swiss expatriate sportspeople in Egypt
Swiss expatriate sportspeople in Algeria
Swiss expatriate sportspeople in Morocco
Al Masry SC managers
MO Béjaïa managers
Swiss expatriate sportspeople in Saudi Arabia
Expatriate football managers in Morocco
Egyptian Premier League managers
Saudi Professional League managers
Algerian Ligue Professionnelle 1 managers
Botola managers
Sportspeople from Valais